Porphyrio is the swamphen or swamp hen bird genus in the rail family. It includes some smaller species of gallinules which are sometimes separated as genus Porphyrula or united with the gallinules proper (or "moorhens") in Gallinula. The Porphyrio gallinules are distributed in the warmer regions of the world. The group probably originated in Africa in the Middle Miocene, before spreading across the world in waves from the Late Miocene to Pleistocene.

The genus Porphyrio was introduced by the French zoologist Mathurin Jacques Brisson in 1760 with the western swamphen (Porphyrio porphyrio) as the type species.  The genus name Porphyrio is the Latin name for "swamphen", meaning "purple".

Species
The genus contains ten extant species and two that have become extinct in historical times:

Extant species
 Purple swamphen complex
 Western swamphen, Porphyrio porphyrio
 African swamphen, Porphyrio madagascariensis
 Grey-headed swamphen, Porphyrio poliocephalus
 Black-backed swamphen, Porphyrio indicus
 Philippine swamphen, Porphyrio pulverulentus
 Australasian swamphen, Porphyrio melanotus
 South Island takahē, Porphyrio hochstetteri
 Allen's gallinule, also known as lesser gallinule, Porphyrio alleni (formerly Porphyrula alleni)
 American purple gallinule, Porphyrio martinicus (formerly Porphyrula martinica)
 Azure gallinule, Porphyrio flavirostris

Extinct species
 Lord Howe swamphen, Porphyrio albus (early 19th century)
 Marquesas swamphen, Porphyrio paepae (prehistoric or )
 New Caledonian swamphen, Porphyrio kukwiedei (prehistoric or more recent)
 Huahine swamphen, Porphyrio mcnabi (prehistoric)
 Buka swamphen, Porphyrio sp. (prehistoric)
 Giant swamphen, Porphyrio sp. (prehistoric)
 New Ireland swamphen, Porphyrio sp. (prehistoric)
 Norfolk Island swamphen, Porphyrio sp. (prehistoric)
 Rota swamphen, Porphyrio sp. (prehistoric)
 Mangaia swamphen/woodhen, ?Porphyrio sp. (prehistoric) - would belong into Porphyrula, Gallinula or Pareudiastes

References

Taylor, P. Barry & van Perlo, Ber (1998): Rails: a guide to the rails, crakes, gallinules, and coots of the world. Yale University Press, New Haven.

External links

 Swamphens fighting, Centennial Park, Sydney, YouTube
 Swamphens fighting, Centennial Park, Sydney, YouTube

 
Bird genera
Taxa named by Mathurin Jacques Brisson